Chenzhou or Chen Prefecture was a zhou (prefecture) in imperial China seated in modern Yuanling County, Hunan, China. It existed (intermittently) from the 6th century to 1913.

Between 1364 and 1913 during the Ming dynasty and Qing dynasty it was known as Chenzhou Prefecture.

Geography
The administrative region of Chenzhou in the Tang dynasty is under the administration of modern Huaihua in western Hunan: 
Yuanling County
Chenxi County
Xupu County
Huaihua
Zhongfang County
Hongjiang

References
 

Prefectures of the Sui dynasty
Prefectures of the Tang dynasty
Prefectures of the Song dynasty
Prefectures of Ma Chu
Prefectures of the Yuan dynasty
Prefectures of the Ming dynasty
Prefectures of the Qing dynasty
Former prefectures in Hunan